Putt-Putt Joins the Parade is a 1992 video game and the first of seven adventure games in the Putt-Putt series of games developed and published by Humongous Entertainment. Upon release, the game sold over 300,000 copies. The combined sales of Putt-Putt Joins the Parade, Putt-Putt Goes to the Moon and Putt-Putt Saves the Zoo surpassed one million units by June 1997. This is also first game by Humongous Entertainment.

Plot
Putt-Putt (voiced by Jason Ellefson) wakes up one morning and turns on his radio, which says that today is the day of the Cartown pet parade. Putt-Putt becomes interested in participating, but acknowledges that he doesn't have a pet. He decides to visit Smokey the Fire Engine, who is in charge of the parade, to talk to him about it. Smokey tells Putt-Putt that he will need to bring a pet and a balloon, as well as get a car wash. He suggests to Putt-Putt that he try mowing lawns for money to pay for the car wash (even letting Putt-Putt borrow his lawn mower). Putt-Putt is also able to help Mr. Baldini, the owner of the local grocery store, by delivering groceries to friends.

While completing his goals, Putt-Putt has to clear obstacles on street paths (which includes nails, birds and a marching band of mice). Putt-Putt soon makes enough money to get a carwash, helps Mrs. Airbag by finding her lost son, Baby Beep, in the movie theater, getting a balloon as a reward and meets a stray puppy in a cave, whom he befriends by giving him a bone and names him "Pep". After Putt-Putt does all the tasks he needed to do, Smokey signs him up for the parade and even lets him lead the parade. The cars in the parade all drive off as the sun sets and the credits roll.

Gameplay
The game plays like a typical point-and-click adventure game with the player moving Putt-Putt from one location to the next, picking up items and using them with mouse clicks. In the 3DO version, the on-screen pointing cursor is moved with the D-pad and a button is used to click on what the cursor is pointing at. Fully voiced characters can be talked to and every scene is filled with colorful and animated interactions. Putt-Putt places collected items in his glove box, which serves as a simple heads-up display.

Release
After the game's creation, Humongous Entertainment had intended to get Electronic Arts to distribute the product, invoking a lawsuit from Lucasarts over the ownership of the SCUMM game engine and disruption from press release.

When a demo of the game was completed, it was uploaded to CompuServe. It took time before a single user downloaded the game, then gave a lengthy review which gave a steady increase in audience.

Reception

In 1997, a study conducted by the University of Texas at Austin compared children's reception of educational games with their professionally assigned developmentally appropriate practice (DAP) ratings. Of the thirteen programs selected, Putt-Putt Joins the Parade ranked as the most frequently played game.

References

External links
 
 Putt-Putt Joins the Parade at Humongous Entertainment

Putt-Putt Joins the Parade
Humongous Entertainment games
3DO Interactive Multiplayer games
Adventure games
DOS games
Linux games
Classic Mac OS games
ScummVM-supported games
Windows games
Point-and-click adventure games
Video games developed in the United States
Single-player video games
Children's games
Tommo games